Farmersburg is a city in Clayton County, Iowa, United States. The population was 271 at the time of the 2020 census, down from 300 in 2000. The current Mayor is Glenn Radloff, a cross-country truck driver.

History
Farmersburg was first called Windsor when it was surveyed in 1856.

In 1916, Farmersburg contained three general stores, bank, hotel, grain elevator, and lumber yards.

Geography
Farmersburg's longitude and latitude coordinatesin decimal form are 42.958516, -91.367555.The city is located in Farmersburg Township, T94N R4W §18.

Demographics

2010 census
As of the census of 2010, there were 302 people, 126 households, and 80 families living in the city. The racial makeup of the city was 97.0% White, 0.3% African American, 0.3% Asian, and 2.3% from two or more races. Hispanic or Latino of any race were 0.3% of the population.

There were 126 households, of which 34.9% had children under the age of 18 living with them, 52.4% were married couples living together, 6.3% had a female householder with no husband present, 4.8% had a male householder with no wife present, and 36.5% were non-families. 28.6% of all households were made up of individuals, and 13.5% had someone living alone who was 65 years of age or older. The average household size was 2.40 and the average family size was 2.96.

The median age in the city was 37.4 years. 26.8% of residents were under the age of 18; 8.3% were between the ages of 18 and 24; 24.2% were from 25 to 44; 26.2% were from 45 to 64; and 14.6% were 65 years of age or older. The gender makeup of the city was 48.3% male and 51.7% female.

2000 census
As of the census of 2000, there were 300 people, 123 households, and 83 families living in the city. The racial makeup of the city was 98.33% White, and 1.67% from two or more races. Hispanic or Latino of any race were 1.67% of the population.

There were 123 households, out of which 30.1% had children under the age of 18 living with them, 60.2% were married couples living together, 4.9% had a female householder with no husband present, and 32.5% were non-families. 29.3% of all households were made up of individuals, and 17.1% had someone living alone who was 65 years of age or older. The average household size was 2.44 and the average family size was 3.02.

In the city, the population was spread out, with 26.0% under the age of 18, 6.3% from 18 to 24, 28.7% from 25 to 44, 20.3% from 45 to 64, and 18.7% who were 65 years of age or older. The median age was 39 years. For every 100 females, there were 93.5 males. For every 100 females age 18 and over, there were 89.7 males.

The median income for a household in the city was $34,000, and the median income for a family was $40,694. Males had a median income of $28,750 versus $20,278 for females. The per capita income for the city was $14,796. About 2.6% of families and 6.3% of the population were below the poverty line, including none of those under the age of eighteen and 10.9% of those 65 or over.

Education
It is within the MFL MarMac Community School District. The district formed on July 1, 1994 with the merger of the Mar-Mac and M-F-L districts.

Notable person

John L. Bascom, attorney and Iowa State Representative

References

External links

 
City-Data Comprehensive statistical data and more about Farmersburg

Cities in Iowa
Cities in Clayton County, Iowa
1856 establishments in Iowa
Populated places established in 1856